Alpha Gamma was an American collegiate fraternity.  It was founded at Cumberland University in Lebanon, Tennessee in 1867.  Perhaps 21 chapters may have developed, with prominent chapters at Washington & Jefferson College, Trinity College (Duke), Mercersburg College, Southwestern Presbyterian University, Cumberland University, and the West Virginia University. Eight of these are known.

The fraternity's badge consisted of a golden shield with a globe, six stars, and a pennant with the letters  centered on the globe.

The fraternity eventually disbanded, with Baird's indicating that this occurred in the 1880s.  The Trinity (Duke) and West Virginia chapters met their demise because of local anti-fraternity laws.  Several chapters, including those at Washington & Jefferson College, Southwestern Presbyterian University at Alabama became chapters of Alpha Tau Omega, with the Washington & Lee chapter joining Chi Phi. These chapter withdrawals occurred over a period of several years, with no specific merger process.

Chapters
Known chapters of Alpha Gamma include the following.  Those which merged into other national organizations are in bold, those which went dormant are in italics.

References

Student organizations established in 1867
Student societies in the United States
Defunct fraternities and sororities
1867 establishments in Tennessee